Volodymyr Vasylyovych Kovalyuk (born on 3 March 1972 in Kosiv, Ivano-Frankivsk Oblast, Ukrainian SSR) is a 
retired professional Ukrainian football defender and midfielder who has previously played for Karpaty Lviv, Dnipro Dnipropetrovsk, Dynamo Kyiv and FC Shakhtar Donetsk.

After retiring from active football playing, Korolyuk was appointed on 16 February 2012 as the head coach of the FC Enerhetyk Burshtyn in the Ukrainian First League.

References

External links 
 
 
 

1972 births
Living people
Ukrainian footballers
Ukrainian expatriate footballers
Expatriate footballers in Russia
FC Karpaty Lviv players
FC Skala Stryi (1911) players
FC Spartak Ivano-Frankivsk players
FC Dnipro players
FC Elista players
FC Dynamo Kyiv players
FC Shakhtar Donetsk players
FC Enerhetyk Burshtyn players
FC Kuban Krasnodar players
FC Kryvbas Kryvyi Rih players
FC Borysfen Boryspil players
FC Kalush players
FC Volyn Lutsk players
FC Dnipro Cherkasy players
FC Prykarpattia Ivano-Frankivsk (2004) players
Ukrainian Premier League players
Ukrainian football managers
FC Enerhetyk Burshtyn managers
FC Karpaty Yaremche managers
FC Prykarpattia Ivano-Frankivsk (1998) managers
Association football midfielders
Association football defenders
Sportspeople from Ivano-Frankivsk Oblast